Julius 'Jack' Wegner (21 July 1913 – 30 April 1982) was an Australian rules footballer who played with Fitzroy in the Victorian Football League (VFL).

Family
The son of Bernhard Julius Wegener (1879-1954), and Sophia Eliza Johanna "Dorothy" Wegener, née Uppink, Julius Wegener was born at Richmond, Victoria on 21 July 1913.

He married Iris Emily Schwaebsch on 30 September 1939.

His twin brother, Hans Johannes Wegener (1913-1951), a.k.a. "Andrew Wegner", played VFA football with Northcote.

Notes

References

External links 
 		
 
 Jack Wegner, at The VFA Project
 Andrew Wegner, at The VFA Project: Jack Wegner's twin brother

1913 births
1982 deaths
Australian rules footballers from Melbourne
Fitzroy Football Club players
Northcote Football Club players
People from Richmond, Victoria